Popples is an animated television series, based on the Popples toys, created by Marie Cisterino, Janet Jones, Fran Kariotakis, Janet Redding, and Susan Trentel, that aired in syndication in the United States from 1986 to 1987 and Sky Channel in the United Kingdom from 1987 to 1988. The cartoon was produced by DIC Enterprises and LBS Communications in association with The Maltese Companies.

Like the toys which they are based on, the Popples resemble colorful teddy bears/rabbits with long, pompom-tipped tails, and they have pouches on their backs that allow them to curl into a fuzzy ball. All the Popples stutter when they say words with the letter "P" in them. The name "Popple" is a reference to the popping sound they make when unfolding themselves from such a ball, or pulling objects from their pouches. In the cartoon Popples commonly pull large items from their pouches that could not possibly fit inside, which come from hammerspace; in "Popples Alley", one of the Popples' human friends looks inside one of their pouches and sees numerous objects floating in a void.

Nine of the Popples live with a human brother and sister, Billy and Bonnie Wagner. Billy and Bonnie think they are the only kids who have Popples until a neighbor family moves in and they have their own Popples — the Rock Stars, Pufflings, and Babies. The Popples tend to make the kids activities go out of hand, but with beneficial results by the end. The plot revolved around the children's efforts to hide the existence of the Popples from the adults around them, although their existence is found out by the Wagner parents in the pilot and not in the cartoons.

The Popples also had a comic book series from Star Comics (an imprint of Marvel Comics).

A Netflix series based on the characters premiered in October 2015.

Characters

The humans
 Bonnie Wagner: Older sister of Billy, who tries to control the chaotic situations the Popples tend to cause.
 Billy Wagner: Younger brother of Bonnie, who doesn't seem bothered by the antics of the Popples.
 Ellen Wagner: Bonnie and Billy's mother, who remains unaware of the Popples, except in the pilot episode. Her face is usually unseen.
 Danny Wagner: Bonnie and Billy's father, also unaware of the Popples, except in the pilot episode. Appears less than his wife, and his face is usually unseen, like his wife.
 Mike: One of the siblings who moved next to the Wagners in the second season, along with their own Popples.
 Penny: Mike's sister.

Bonnie & Billy's Popples
 PC (Pretty Cool): Large blue Popple, who serves as the co-leader of the bunch along with Party. Although he loves to have fun, he never lets things get too out of hand and is probably the most sensible member of the group. He also has a magic finger snap that can trigger all sorts of neat surprises. PC appeared in 40 episodes.
 Party: Large pink Popple who is literally a party animal. She'll find a reason to party any time day or night and is always pulling party hats and confetti from her pouch. Party serves as the primary Popple, as she appears in 41 of the show's 46 episodes and on the Popples logo.
 Pancake: Large dark magenta (maroon) Popple who is very sweet and affectionate. She likes to tickle Billy and Bonnie with her tail and always knows just what to do to cheer someone up. Pancake had the fewest appearances of the original nine Popples, appearing in only 10 episodes.
 Puzzle: Orange Popple who is more or less the bookworm of the bunch. He enjoys reading and is quite intelligent, but he still has a great sense of humor. Puzzle is also shown to be a good swimmer. Puzzle appeared in 15 episodes.
 Prize: Hot Pink Popple who is very vain and takes great pride in her appearance. She has a small crush on PC, speaks in a Marilyn Monroe-esque voice and dreams of being a film star. Prize appeared in 15 episodes.
 Puffball: White Popple who loves to throw her voice around. She is very skilled at imitating voices to trick people and Popples alike. She also hates getting her white fur dirty and tries hard to stay clean. Puffball appeared in 15 episodes.
 Putter: Small green Popple who is somewhat hyperactive and has a tendency to do practical jokes but is very playful. Putter has a knack for fixing and inventing things, but they do not always work quite like he expects. Putter had the most appearances outside of the two lead Popples, appearing in 25 episodes.
 Potato Chip: Small yellow Popple who loves to eat snacks. Sweet, sour or salty, Potato Chip loves them all and has quite an appetite for such a small Popple. She also has a talent for imitating sounds and sound effects. Potato Chip appeared in 18 episodes.
 Pretty Bit: Small purple Popple who almost always speaks in rhyme. She is more shy than most of the Popples, but is still very loyal to her friends. She enjoys poetry and is also an expert on manners and etiquette. Pretty Bit appeared in 11 episodes.

Mike & Penny's Popples
 Punkster: One of the punk-rockstar Popples. Punkster is blue, wears a pink and yellow cape and carries a guitar, and has a lightning bolt on his tummy. He is regarded as Papa Popple for the baby Popples. Always appears with Punkity and was featured in 15 episodes.
 Punkity: The other punk-rockstar Popple. Punkity is magenta, wears a green hair accessory and earrings and carries a microphone or tambourine, and has a star on her tummy. She is regarded as Mama Popple for the baby Popples. Always appears with Punkster and was featured in 15 episodes.
 Bibsy: One of the Baby Popples. Bibsy is white and wears a purple and white bib, booties and bonnet with a star pattern. He was featured in 14 episodes.
 Cribsy: Another Baby Popple. Cribsy is pink, and wears a striped white and blue hat with a matching bib and booties and even her eyelids are blue. He was featured in 14 episodes.
 Pufflings: A sub-species of smaller Popples. Pufflings are unable to speak, but communicate with others with a high-pitched warbling sound.  The Pufflings like to hop and bounce around and sometimes give out joke tags that one of the Popples will read out loud. The six Pufflings have white, dark blue, red, purple, light blue and yellow fur.

Sports Popples
This was a group of six sports-themed Popples who appeared in only two episodes:  "Decatha-Pop-A-Lon Popples" (in which all six appeared) and "Popple Cheer" (in which all but Cuester appeared). The only previously established character they ever make contact with is Bonnie, in the latter cartoon, where they explain they're "new in the neighbourhood". They are both played by Danny Mann.

The Sports Popples each specialize in one sport, wears an outfit based on that sport, and folds into an appropriate type of ball. Even their tails are shaped like sports balls:

 Big Kick is a soccer player who turns into a soccerball.
 Cuester is a pool player who turns into an 8-ball and appeared in "Decatha-Pop-A-Lon Popples".
 Dunker is a long-limbed basketball player who turns into a basketball.
 Net Set is a tennis player who turns into a tennis ball.
 Pitcher is a baseball player who turns into a baseball.
 T.D. (Touchdown) is a player of American football who turns into a football.

Voice Cast

Episodes

Popples broadcast 47 episodes, including the pilot, with two segments contained in each half-hour show. Both of the season's intros and endings are different.

Season 1 (1986–1987)

Season 2 (1987)

Release

Home media
A single-disc DVD of the series was released in the UK by Maximum Entertainment in 2004, containing 10 segments.

Streaming
As of 2020, the show can be found on Pluto TV and on demand at Paramount+.

VHS UK history
 Tempo Video (1987–1988)

Broadcast UK history
 Sky Channel (1987–1988)

See also
 Care Bears
 The Wuzzles
 My Little Pony

References

External links
 
 

1986 American television series debuts
1987 American television series endings
1980s American animated television series
American children's animated fantasy television series
First-run syndicated television programs in the United States
Star Comics titles
Kideo TV
Television series by DIC Entertainment
Television shows based on Mattel toys
Television shows adapted into comics